The 1996 Notre Dame Fighting Irish football team represented the University of Notre Dame in the 1996 NCAA Division I-A football season. The team was coached by Lou Holtz and played its home games at Notre Dame Stadium in South Bend, Indiana.

Notre Dame participated in the Emerald Isle Classic (Billed as the Shamrock Classic that year). The game was played in Dublin on November 2 at Croke Park, where Notre Dame beat Navy by a score of 54–27.

Despite finishing the regular season 8-3, Notre Dame did not play in a bowl game. The Fighting Irish turned down an invitation to play the Auburn Tigers in the Independence Bowl, believing that Auburn was an unworthy opponent and that the Independence Bowl was an unworthy bowl destination.

Rivalries
 In the Holy War match against Boston College, Notre Dame beat BC to claim the Frank Leahy Memorial Bowl.
 Notre Dame beat Purdue to claim the Shillelagh Trophy.
 Notre Dame loses to USC in overtime, snapping a 13-game unbeaten streak against the Trojans.

Schedule

Roster

Season summary

USC

References

Notre Dame
Notre Dame Fighting Irish football seasons
Notre Dame Fighting Irish football